Margaret Yarde (2 April 1878 – 11 March 1944) was a British actress. Initially training to be an opera singer, she made her London stage debut in 1907. She often played domestics, landladies and mothers.

Filmography

 A Cigarette-Maker's Romance (1913) - Woman
 The Only Way (1925) - The Vengeance
 London (1926) - Eliza Critten
 Night Birds (1930) - Mrs. Hallick
 The Woman Between (1931) - Mrs. Robinson
 Uneasy Virtue (1931) - Mrs. Robinson
 Third Time Lucky (1931) - Mrs. Clutterbuck
 Let's Love and Laugh (1931) - Bride's Mother
 Michael and Mary (1931) - Mrs. Tullivant
 The Sign of Four (1932) - Mrs. Smith
 The Good Companions (1933) - Mrs. Mounder
 Enemy of the Police (1933) - Lady Tapleigh
 A Shot in the Dark (1933) - Kate Browne
 The Man from Toronto (1933) - Mrs. Hubbard
 Matinee Idol (1933) - Mrs. Clappit
 Trouble in Store (1934, Short) - Landlady
 Guest of Honour (1934) - Emma Tidmarsh
 Tiger Bay (1934) - Fay
 Nine Forty-Five (1934) - Margaret Clancy
 Sing As We Go (1934) - Mrs. Clotty
 Father and Son (1934) - Victoria
 A Glimpse of Paradise (1934) - Mrs. Kidd
 The Broken Rosary (1934) - Nanny
 Widow's Might (1935) - Cook
 Handle with Care (1935) - Mrs. Tunbody
 Who's Your Father (1935) - Mrs. Medway
 That's My Uncle (1935) - Mrs. Frisbee
 18 Minutes (1935) - Marie
 Full Circle (1935) - Agatha
 Jubilee Window (1935) - Mrs. Holroyd
 It Happened in Paris (1935) - Marthe
 Squibs (1935) - Mrs. Lee
 The Crouching Beast (1935) - Bar owner
 The Deputy Drummer (1935) - Lady Sylvester
 Man of the Moment (1935) - Landlady
 Scrooge (1935) - Scrooge's Laundress
 Queen of Hearts (1936) - Mrs. Porter
 Faithful (1936) - Mrs. Kemp
 In the Soup (1936) - Mrs. Bates
 Gypsy Melody (1936) - Grand Duchess
 No Escape (1936) - Bunty
 Beauty and the Barge (1937) - Mrs. Porter
 Secret Lives (1937) - Bakery Customer (uncredited)
 The Compulsory Wife (1937) - Mrs. Thackery
 Merry Comes to Town (1937) - (uncredited)
 French Leave (1937) - Mme. Dernaux
 You Live and Learn (1937) - Mrs. Biddle
 Calling All Ma's (1937) - Ma-in-Law
 Prison Without Bars (1938) - Mlle. Artemise
 You're the Doctor (1939) - Mrs. Taggart
 The Face at the Window (1939) - La Pinan
 French Without Tears (1940) - Marianne
 Crimes at the Dark House (1940) - Mrs. Bullen
 The Second Mr. Bush (1940) - (uncredited)
 Henry Steps Out (1940) - Cynthia Smith
 George and Margaret (1940) - Cook
 Two Smart Men (1940) - Mrs. Smith
 Tomorrow We Live (1943) - Fauntel
 Thursday's Child (1943) - Mrs. Chard
 It's in the Bag (1944) - Landlady (uncredited)

References

External links

1878 births
1944 deaths
Actresses from Devon
English stage actresses
English film actresses
English silent film actresses
People from Dartmouth, Devon
20th-century English actresses